Spyros Fourlanos (born 19 November 1993) is a Greek professional footballer who plays as a midfielder for Super League 2 club Egaleo.

Club career
Fourlanos comes from Panathinaikos's youth ranks.

On 27 November 2011, during a Superleague match vs. OFI Crete, he made his debut for the men's team of Panathinaikos coming on as a substitute.

On 15 May 2013, he agreed a transfer to Club Brugge. On 31 December 2013 he was loaned from Club Brugge to Kalloni for 6 months. The 20-year-old midfielder had agreed to a six-month loan deal as he wanted to be playing first team football more regularly.

In June 2014, he signed with Greek Super League club Panionios, but after six months he signed for the  years with Panachaiki. On 17 November 2015, after having been a free agent, he signed for German 3. Liga side Sonnenhof Großaspach until 2017. On 28 August 2016, he signed with Chania for an undisclosed fee. On 29 January 2017, he scored his first goal in his professional career in a 4-0 home win against Kalloni. On 25 August 2017, he re-signed with his former club Panachaiki.

Career statistics

References

External links
 
 UEFA.com

1993 births
Living people
Greek expatriate footballers
Greece youth international footballers
Greece under-21 international footballers
Panathinaikos F.C. players
Super League Greece players
Club Brugge KV players
Panionios F.C. players
Panachaiki F.C. players
Belgian Pro League players
Expatriate footballers in Belgium
Expatriate footballers in Germany
Association football midfielders
Greek expatriate sportspeople in Belgium
Greek expatriate sportspeople in Germany
Footballers from Athens
Greek footballers
Asteras Vlachioti F.C. players
Ionikos F.C. players
AO Chania F.C. players
SG Sonnenhof Großaspach players
AEL Kalloni F.C. players